A knife bin, also known as a knife bank, weapon surrender bin, knife amnesty bin or knife amnesty bank, is a place where the owners of knives may dispose of them in a safe and legal way. Knife bins are associated with attempts to reduce knife crime and may be sponsored by the police or churches.

Background 
On 8 February 2006, the United Kingdom home secretary, Charles Clarke announced that police forces in England, Scotland and Wales would hold a national knife amnesty between 24 May and 30 June 2006 in order to "reduce the devastation caused by knife crime." Since then, occasional amnesties have been held in local areas around the country. While Police agencies have observed some reductions in reports of knife crime during and after these amnesties, the effects are usually only short term. There is limited evidence that these amnesties are effective, other than raising awareness of the issues. Although, campaigners argue they do make a difference.

See also 
Knife Angel
Knife legislation

References

External links 

Knife Bin Locations in Greater London

Crime prevention
Knives